XHJAQ-FM is a radio station on 107.1 FM in Jalpan de Serra, Querétaro, Mexico. The station is owned by Grupo Edikam and carries a grupera format known as La Ke Buena. The transmitter is located atop Cerro la Colgada in Jalpan de Serra.

History
XHJAQ began as XEJAQ-AM 1040 (later 850), awarded to Rosenda Carmen Sandoval on June 6, 1982. It was initially known as Radio Felicidad, then Radio Joya. For a time, it carried the La Jefa/La Única grupera format from Grupo Siete.

In December 2011, XEJAQ received approval to migrate to FM on 107.1 MHz.

References

Radio stations in Querétaro